Lorenzo Carrió (born 7 November 1973) is a Spanish weightlifter. He competed in the men's heavyweight I event at the 1996 Summer Olympics.

References

1973 births
Living people
Spanish male weightlifters
Olympic weightlifters of Spain
Weightlifters at the 1996 Summer Olympics
People from Alzira, Valencia
Sportspeople from the Province of Valencia
20th-century Spanish people